Carlo Vidusso (1911 in Talcahuano – 1978 in Milan) was an Italian pianist.

He studied piano with Ernesto Drangosch and at 9 years old got a diploma in Buenos Aires. He moved to Italy, studied composition with Giulio Cesare Paribeni and Renzo Bossi at the Conservatorio of Milano and continued his piano studies with Carlo Lonati. He received an honorable mention at the II International Chopin Piano Competition.

A virtuoso with ease of reading, at 20 years old he began an acclaimed concert career, performing in Italy and around Europe. 
In 1953, owing to a disorder in his right hand, he stopped performing in public and thence dedicated himself to teaching. Maurizio Pollini and Giorgio  Koukl were among his many students.

He fingered and revised many piano compositions.

References 

Italian classical pianists
male classical pianists
Italian male pianists
1911 births
1978 deaths
Milan Conservatory alumni
Chilean classical pianists
Chilean emigrants to Italy
Chilean people of Italian descent
People from Talcahuano
20th-century classical pianists
20th-century Italian musicians
20th-century Italian male musicians